Clara is an unincorporated community in Wayne County, Mississippi, United States. It is located at (31.5804410, -88.6964273). The population was 386 at the 2020 census.

Demographics 

As of the 2020 United States census, there were 386 people, 291 households, and 118 families residing in the CDP.

References

Unincorporated communities in Mississippi
Unincorporated communities in Wayne County, Mississippi